South Sea Adventure is a 1952 children's book by the Canadian-born American author Willard Price featuring his "Adventure" series characters, Hal and Roger Hunt. The novel depicts an expedition to the South Pacific to capture animals for a zoo, and introduces the recurring villain Merlin Kaggs.

Plot 
Much of South Sea Adventure involves the Hunt brothers becoming stranded on an island in the manner of Robinson Crusoe. However, Hal and Roger's island is a pitiless environment scarce in such necessities as fresh water and adequate food. The brothers use their knowledge of science and zoology to survive.

Allies
 Captain Ike- An old WW2 captain currently in command of the ship Lively Lady. His wife often accompanies him on his voyages but was told to remain behind on this trip due to the danger involved. While crusty and suspicious at first, he gradually develops a friendship with Hal and Roger.  
 Omo- Captain Ike's first mate. He became a blood brother of Hal after his life was saved by the boy. He later took a bullet for him when trapped on the desert island.

Enemies
 "Merlin Kaggs"- An shadowy, unseen character for most of the book although his presence is felt throughout. When he does make his appearance he removes his failed henchman, Crab, from the picture and tries to convince the boys that he is a Christian minister. The ploy worked to begin with although Hal became suspicious towards the end. When they reached the island he tried to steal its pearl beds but was driven away by the boys and eventually went mad after drinking sea water out of desperation. He then went on to appear in later novels.
 Crab- A spy placed aboard the ship by Merlin Kaggs. Lazy and shiftless, he ultimately failed to acquire the location of the boys' secret pearl island and was abandoned and framed by Kaggs as a result. Hal eventually bailed him out of prison and he promptly joined the crew on a tanker and left without even a word of thanks.

Legacy
In 2015, South Sea Adventure was named among the "100 best children's books of all time" by The Telegraph.

References

Novels by Willard Price
1952 American novels
Novels set in Oceania
1952 children's books
Novels about survival skills
John Day Company books